John Whiteside (1773 – July 28, 1830) was a member of the U.S. House of Representatives from Pennsylvania.

John Whiteside was born near Lancaster, Pennsylvania.  He attended the common schools and Chestnut Level Academy.  He employed on his father's farm, and later engaged in the hotel business and operated a distillery.  He was a justice of the peace and a member of the Pennsylvania House of Representatives in 1810 and 1811.

Whiteside was elected as a Republican to the Fourteenth and Fifteenth Congresses.  He resumed the hotel business in Lancaster and served as register of wills and again a member of the Pennsylvania House of Representatives in 1825.  He died in Lancaster in 1830.  Interment in Lancaster Cemetery.

Sources

The Political Graveyard

1773 births
1830 deaths
Members of the Pennsylvania House of Representatives
Politicians from Lancaster, Pennsylvania
Democratic-Republican Party members of the United States House of Representatives from Pennsylvania
Businesspeople from Lancaster, Pennsylvania